is a 1967 Japanese drama film directed by Noboru Nakamura. It was entered into the 17th Berlin International Film Festival.

Cast
 Michiyo Aratama
 Yoshiko Kayama
 Mariko Kaga
 Mikijiro Hira
 Mitsuko Mori
 Eijirō Tōno

References

External links

1967 films
Japanese drama films
1967 drama films
Films directed by Noboru Nakamura
1960s Japanese-language films
Films scored by Masaru Sato
1960s Japanese films